Paul Valéry University of Montpellier, also known as or UPVM (official acronym) or Montpellier III (UM3, until early 2015), is a French university in the Academy of Montpellier. It is one of the three successor universities to the University of Montpellier, specialising in the arts, languages and social sciences.

The university is a member of the Coimbra Group, an association of long-established European multidisciplinary universities of high international standard.

History

Origins

The University of Montpellier, founded on 26 October 1289 through a bull issued by Pope Nicholas IV combining the schools of Medicine, Arts and Law, is the third university founded in France, following those of Paris and Toulouse.

In 1939, the new Faculty of Humanities was built in the city centre, facing Saint Pierre's Cathedral on the rue du Cardinal de Cabrières (currently home to part of the University of Montpellier 1's Law Faculty), and inaugurated by the then Dean Augustin Fliche.

In 1970, the former faculties formed three separate universities (Montpellier I, II and III). The Faculty of Arts, Languages, Social Sciences and Humanities becoming the "University of Montpellier III", whilst also taking on the name of Paul Valéry as a homage to the Sète-born writer who studied in Montpellier.

In 2015, the Universities of Montpellier I and II merged to be the University of Montpellier. Therefore, the University Paul Valéry of Montpellier III became University Paul-Valéry of Montpellier (UPVM).

Since 2002, all Nîmes students have been included in the University of Nîmes and are no longer part of the University of Montpellier III.

Presidents

Campus
Having become too cramped, the university moved in 1966 to a campus of over 10 hectares in the north of the city (route de Mende), close to the University of Montpellier II's new campus. In order to avoid confusion with the University of Montpellier 2, the architectural aesthetic was very carefully selected and large green spaces created.

In 1986 a new building comprising three lecture theatres (one seating 800 students) was built.

In 1998, a second University campus was built in Béziers on the site of the former Duguesclin barracks.

A move of the university's UFR 5 (psychology and sociology department) is currently being planned to the Saint-Charles site in Montpellier city centre.

Organisation
The university is organised into six teaching and research units:
 Letters, Arts, Philosophy and Psychoanalysis
 Languages and Cultures
 Human and Environmental Sciences
 Social and Organisational Sciences
 Subject and Societal Sciences - Psychology, sociology and anthropology
 Education - education, physical and sports education, mathematics.

It also has an Institute of Information Technoscience.

Student life 

Student life is coordinated through the Maison des Étudiants, a place for students' activities, freedom of expression, clubs and societies.

Its aim is to help students realise their own ambitions, allowing them to open up and develop a place for creation, as well as cultural and campus activities.

The Maison des Étudiants and its "Jean Moulin" function room are an important centre for student life on campus, playing host to: dance, music, theatre and first aid classes, as well as conferences, film screenings, debates, exhibitions, solidarity and cultural days, concerts and student evenings, amongst others.

Representative student organisations 
Following the student elections of 30 and 31 May 2006 (postponed due to the anti-CPE blockades in March) marked by a low level of participation of around 5% (but a strong one from the Béziers campus of nearly 20%), the representative student organisations are as follows:

 Tribune Étudiante, Confédération étudiante, Avis Culturel : 4 elected to the CA, 4 elected to the CEVU
 UNEF : 3 elected to the CA, 3 elected to the CEVU
 Sud étudiant : 3 elected to the CA, 3 elected to the CEVU
 Melting-Pot : 2 elected to the CA, 2 elected to the CEVU, 1 elected to the CS
 Caraïbe Afrique Solidarité Étudiante (The CASE) : 1 elected to the CA, 1 elected to the CEVU
 Corpo Lettres Epsylone : 1 elected to the CA, 1 elected to the CEVU
 UNI : 1 elected to the CA, 1 elected to the CEVU
 La liste Culturelle étudiante : 1 elected to the CEVU
 Association Contact : 1 elected to the CS
 Étudiants solidaires : 1 elected to the CS
 Réseau doctorant UPV : 1 elected to the CS

Other active associations 
All student associations do not inevitably participate in representative student elections but are not less active. Numerous cultural associations, such as Asso7, ECUME or l'Écran et son Double, actively participate in campus activities.

The associations and student unions are housed in the "Maison des Etudiants", found on the north side of campus near the Vert Bois university restaurant.

Notable people

Faculty
 François Doumenge (1926, Viane, Tarn - 2008) - geographer who specialized in marine and island geography
 Jean Joubert (1928 Châlette-sur-Loing, Loiret - 2015) - novelist, short story writer, and poet
 Larry Portis (1943 in Bremerton, Washington – 2011 in Soudorgues, France) - historian
 Marlene Zarader (born 1949) - philosopher
 Marc Gabolde (born 1957 Nantes) - Egyptologist 
 Burghart Schmidt (born 1962, Hamburg) - historian; university president
 Jean-Christophe Valtat (born 1968) - Modern literature

Alumni
 Ahmad Kamyabi Mask (born 1944) - professor emeritus of comparative literature and theatrical studies
 Élisabeth Guigou (born 1946, Marrakesh, Morocco) - politician SP
 Colette Mélot (born 1947, Sète) - teacher, politician TR
 Henry Fourès (born 1948, Coursan) - historian of music and musician
 Sonia Marta Mora Escalante (born 1953) - education administrator Costa Rica
 Tahar Rahim (born 1981) - Franco-Algerian actor
 Étienne Leenhardt (born Montpellier) - journalist and editor
Thierry Ardisson (born 1949, Bourganeuf, Creuse) - television host and movie producer
 Emigdio Flores Calpiñeiro (born 1950, Cobija) - politician and sociologist Bolivia 
 Rollie Cook (born 1952, Edmonton, Canada) - politician PC
 Brenda Marie Osbey (born 1957 New Orleans) - American poet

See also

 Cercam
 University of Montpellier
 List of public universities in France by academy
 Coimbra Group

References 

University of Montpellier
Educational institutions established in 1970
1970 establishments in France
Universities and colleges in Montpellier